WM Entertainment (Hangul: WM 엔터테인먼트) is a South Korean entertainment company established in 2008 by former singer Lee Won-min (birth name: Kim Jung-soo). The company is responsible for managing artists such as B1A4, Oh My Girl, and ONF. In April 7, 2021, the company was acquired by RBW.

History

WM Entertainment was founded in 2008 by former South Korean singer Kim Jung-soo, who formally changed his name to Lee Won-min before establishing WM Entertainment.

The company was originally operated in a one-story building located in Bangbae-dong, Seocho District. In August 2014, Lee Won-min purchased a six-story building located in Mangwon-dong, Mapo District named Daemyung Tower Building for KR₩4.33 billion (approximately US$3.85 million), which functions as the current headquarters for WM Entertainment.

Almost a year after its foundation, WM Entertainment signed up Battle Shinhwa alumnus Taegoon. H-Eugene and Baby Vox Re.V member Ahn Jin-kyung joined the company in 2010.

WM Entertainment debuted their first boy group B1A4 on April 23, 2011.

WM Entertainment's first girl group Oh My Girl debuted on April 21, 2015.

WM Entertainment debuted soloist I (sister of B1A4 member Baro) on January 12, 2017.

WM's second boy group ONF debuted on August 2, 2017.

On April 7, 2021, it was announced that WM Entertainment had 70% of its shares bought by RBW, which houses idol groups such as Mamamoo, Oneus , Vromance, Onewe and Purple Kiss. WM became a subsidiary of RBW.

Artists

Groups 
 B1A4
 Oh My Girl
 Oh My Girl Banhana
 ONF

Soloists 
 Sandeul
 YooA
 Lee Chae-yeon

Former artists
 Taegoon
 H2
 H-Eugene
 Han Soo-yeon
 An Jin-kyung
 Oh My Girl
 JinE (2015–2017)
 Jiho (2015–2022)
 B1A4
 Jinyoung (2011–2018)
 Baro (2011–2018)
 I (2017–2018)
 ONF
 Laun (2017–2019)

Discography

2009

2010

2011

2012

2013

2014

2015

2016

2017

2018

2019

2020

2021

2022

Partnerships

Music labels 
Active
  Universal J (B1A4)
  Victor Entertainment (ONF)
  Ariola Japan (Oh My Girl)

Former partners
  Warner Music Taiwan (B1A4) (2012-2015)
  Pony Canyon (B1A4) (2012-2018)

Distributors
Active
  Sony Music Entertainment Korea
  CJ ENM/Stone Music Entertainment, Genie Music (2017-2021, 2022-present)
  Copan Global (merchandise)
  Universal Music Japan
  JVC Kenwood Victor Entertainment
  Sony Music Solutions

Former partners
  Pony Canyon Korea (2009-2014)
  Warner Music Taiwan (2012-2015)
  Pony Canyon (2012-2018)
  Kakao M (2014-2020)

References

External links

South Korean record labels
Record labels established in 2008
2008 establishments in South Korea
Entertainment companies established in 2008
Talent agencies of South Korea
Companies based in Seoul
Labels distributed by Kakao M
Labels distributed by CJ E&M Music and Live